The Jerusalem J1 is a sub-district of Jerusalem governorate of Palestine

References 

Jerusalem Governorate